Price–sales ratio, P/S ratio, or PSR, is a valuation metric for stocks. It is calculated by dividing the company's market capitalization by the revenue in the most recent year; or, equivalently, divide the per-share stock price by the per-share revenue.

The justified P/S ratio is calculated as the price-to-sales ratio based on the Gordon Growth Model.

Where .

Unless otherwise stated, P/S is "trailing twelve months" (TTM), the reported sales for the four previous quarters, although of course longer time periods can be examined.

The smaller this ratio (i.e. less than 1.0) is usually thought to be a better investment since the investor is paying less for each unit of sales. However, sales do not reveal the whole picture, as the company may be unprofitable with a low P/S ratio. Because of the limitations, this ratio is usually used only for unprofitable companies, since they don't have a price–earnings ratio (P/E ratio). The metric can be used to determine the value of a stock relative to its past performance. It may also be used to determine relative valuation of a sector or the market as a whole.

PSRs vary greatly from sector to sector, so they are most useful in comparing similar stocks within a sector or sub-sector.

Comparing P/S ratios carries the implicit assumption that all firms in the comparison have an identical capital structure.  This is always a problematic assumption, but even more so when the assumption is made between industries, since industries often have vastly different typical capital structures (for example, a utility vs. a technology company).  This is the reason why P/S ratios across industries vary widely.

See also
 Financial ratio
 Price–earnings ratio

References

Financial ratios